"Somebody Stole My Gal" is a popular song from 1918, written by Leo Wood. In 1924, Ted Weems & his Orchestra had a five-week run at number one with his million-selling version.

The song has been featured in several Hollywood movies. including:
The Tip-Off (1931)
Somebody Stole My Gal (1931)
Little Jack Little & Orchestra (1936)
When Willie Comes Marching Home (1950)
My Favorite Year (1982)
The Grass Harp (1995)
Melinda and Melinda (2004)
The Aviator (2004)

Other recordings
Florence Millett - 1918
Ted Weems & His Orch. (Instr.) - 1924
Fletcher Henderson & His Orch. - 1924
Bix Beiderbecke - 1928
Fred Elizalde & His Anglo American Band - 1928
Bennie Moten's Kansas City Orch. - 1930
Ted Lewis & His Band (vocal: Ted Lewis)- 1931
Cab Calloway & His Orch. - 1931
Billy Cotton & His Band - 1931 (Cotton used the song as his signature tune).
Fats Waller & His Rhythm - 1935
Virgil Childers - 1938 in Charlotte, North Carolina
Count Basie & His Orch. - 1940
Benny Goodman & His Orch. (Columbia-35916) - 1940
Johnnie Ray - 1952 (a number 6 hit in the UK Singles Chart in 1953)
John Serry Sr. and his ensemble for "RCA Thesaurus" - 1954
Pee Wee Hunt and his orchestra - 1954 (Album "Swingin' Around")
Jim Kweskin & The Jug Band - 1965 Greatest Hits
Jimmy Roselli - 1967
Mel Blanc - N/k
Max Raabe & Palast Orchester - 1996

References

External links
Theguitarguy.com
Jazzstandards.com
free-scores.com

1918 songs
Number-one singles in the United States
Songs written by Leo Wood
Johnnie Ray songs
Benny Goodman songs